is a passenger railway station located in the city of Tsuyama, Okayama Prefecture, Japan, operated by West Japan Railway Company (JR West).

Lines

Station layout
The station consists of one ground-level side platform serving a single bi-directional track. The station is unattended. The station building, which dates from 1928,  received protection by the national government as a Registered Tangible Cultural Property in 2008.

History
Mimasaka-Takio Station opened on 15 March 1928. With the privatization of the Japan National Railways (JNR) on 1 April 1987, the station came under the aegis of the West Japan Railway Company.

Passenger statistics
In fiscal 2019, the station was used by an average of 34 passengers daily..

Surrounding area
 Tsuyama Municipal Seisen Elementary School
 Okayama Prefectural Road/Tottori Prefectural Road No. 6 Tsuyama Chizu Hatto Line
 Okayama Prefectural Route 348 Horisaka Katsuhoku Line

See also
List of railway stations in Japan

References

External links

 Mimasaka-Takio Station Official Site

Railway stations in Okayama Prefecture
Railway stations in Japan opened in 1928
Tsuyama
Registered Tangible Cultural Properties

-